Tang Dez may refer to:
 Tang Dez-e Olya
 Tang Dez-e Sofla